This is a list of episodes of the 1962–67 ABC war drama Combat!.

Note that the episodes are not in order on the DVDs. Season 1 DVDs do contain Season 1 episodes, but in random order. Use the chart below.
Hint: The Series should be watched following the Production Number (Prod. No.) of episodes, which show the progression of events as traced in WWII history.

Series overview

Episodes

Season 1 (1962–63)

The first-season DVDs come in two sets, "Campaign 1" and "Campaign 2," which are sold separately. Each "Campaign" contains four discs. Each disc contains four episodes plus bonus material. There are eight discs total in both "Campaigns," with 16 episodes in each, for a combined 32 episodes, which are listed in order below.

Season 2 (1963–64)
The second-season DVDs come in two sets, "Mission 1" and "Mission 2," which, like the "Campaigns" of the first-season DVDs, are sold separately. Each "Mission" contains four discs. Each disc contains four episodes plus bonus material. There are eight discs total in both "Missions," with 16 episodes in each, for a combined 32 episodes, which are listed in order below.

Season 3 (1964–65)
The third-season DVDs come in two sets, "Operation 1" and "Operation 2," which, like the first-season "Campaigns" and the second-season "Missions," are sold separately. Each "Operation" contains four discs. Each disc contains four episodes plus bonus material. There are eight discs total in both "Operations," with 16 episodes in each, for a combined 32 episodes, which are listed in order below.

Season 4 (1965–66)
The fourth-season DVDs come in two sets, "Conflict 1" and "Conflict 2," which, like the first-season "Campaigns," the second-season "Missions," and the third-season "Operations," are sold separately. Each "Conflict" contains four discs. Each disc contains four episodes, except from the last CD which contains three episodes, plus bonus material. There are eight discs total in both "Conflicts," with 16 episodes in "Conflict 1" and 15 episodes in "Conflict 2," for a combined 31 episodes, which are listed in order below.

Season 5 (1966–67)
As pointed out in the main article on Combat!, this is the only season of the program produced in color.

The fifth-season DVDs come in two sets, "Invasion 1" and "Invasion 2," which, like the first-season "Campaigns," the second-season "Missions," the third-season "Operations," and the fourth-season "Conflicts," are sold separately. Each "Invasion" contains four discs. Each disc contains three episodes plus bonus material except the first disc of "Invasion 1," which contains four episodes plus bonus material. There are eight discs total in both "Invasions," with 13 episodes in "Invasion 1" and 12 episodes in "Invasion 2," for a combined 25 episodes, which are listed in order below.

External links 

 

Combat!